USS LCI(L)-90 was an amphibious assault ship manned by a United States Coast Guard crew.
She was commissioned in 1943 and was used to land troops in the landings on French North Africa, Sicily and Anzio in 1943, and at Omaha Beach during the Invasion of Normandy in 1944.  She participated in the invasion of Okinawa, where she was attacked by a Japanese kamikaze fighter. Her two commanding officers were both Lieutenant junior grade, of the Coast Guard. William Trump a seaman who volunteered to go ashore before the troops, at Omaha Beach, and lay out a cable through a safe path to shore, was awarded a Silver Star. According to a soldier who landed from LCI-90 during the Invasion of Normandy, the vessel's doors were damaged by enemy fire. During the Invasion of Okinawa LCI-90 was damaged by a kamikaze, after she had landed her soldiers, and one seaman was killed.

See also
Landing Craft Infantry
List of United States Navy Landing Craft Infantry (LCI)
List of United States Navy amphibious warfare ships

References

External links
 http://www.usslci.com
 "Landing Craft, Infantry (Large) - LCI(L)" Shipbuilding History. Retrieved 2010-02-02.

1943 ships
Landing craft
Amphibious warfare vessels of the United States Navy
Maritime incidents in June 1945